Keepit Dam is a major gated mass concrete gravity dam with an earth fill abutment and a central gated concrete overflow crest and six radial gate spillways across the Namoi River upstream of its junction with the Peel River in the North West Slopes region of New South Wales, Australia. The dam's purpose includes flood mitigation, hydro-power, irrigation, water supply and conservation. The impounded reservoir is called Lake Keepit.

Location and features
The dam was built by the New South Wales Water Conservation & Irrigation Commission to supply water for irrigation, flood mitigation and potable water for the town of Walgett.

The central gated overflow crest and six radial gates of the spillway are capable of discharging . An 146.6 million upgrade of facilities commenced in 2009 and resulted in the construction of two spillways and three saddle dams, completed during 2011.

Keepit Dam is operated in conjunction with Split Rock Dam. The two dams supply water requirements along much of the Namoi Valley, used for irrigation including cotton, cereal and wheat crops, lucerne, fodder and pasture, vegetables, vines, orchards and oil seeds.

Power generation

The station was completed in 1960 and upgraded in 1983. The facility is managed by Meridian Energy.

Etymology
The name Keepit originates after a riverside property called Keypit or Keepit, resumed for part of the storage area. The word probably means 'keep it', a derogatory remark about the apparent worthlessness of the pastoral run.

Recreation
The area surrounding Lake Keepit is used for local recreation including camping, picnics, swimming, boating, sailing, water skiing and fishing. The lakeshore is the location of Lake Keepit Soaring Club, the second largest gliding club by membership in Australia.

See also

 Chaffey Dam
 Meridian Energy
 Irrigation in Australia
 List of dams and reservoirs in New South Wales
 Split Rock Dam

References

External links
 
Lake Keepit Sports and Recreation Centre
Lake Keepit Soaring Club

Dams in New South Wales
Dams completed in 1960
Gravity dams
North West Slopes